Richard Straker (born 4 August 1951) is a Barbadian cricketer. He played in eight first-class and four List A matches for the Barbados cricket team from 1976 to 1979.

See also
 List of Barbadian representative cricketers

References

External links
 

1951 births
Living people
Barbadian cricketers
Barbados cricketers
People from Christ Church, Barbados